Palmer Park may refer to:

Palmer Park (Chicago), a public park in Chicago, Illinois, United States
Palmer Park, Colorado Springs, a public park in Colorado Springs, Colorado, United States
Palmer Park (Detroit), a public park
 Palmer Park Apartment Building Historic District, Detroit, Michigan, United States
Palmer Park, Maryland, an unincorporated community within the Greater Landover area of Maryland, United States
Palmer Park (Reading, Berkshire), a public park in the town of Reading, England